Cardel may refer to:

 Cardel Homes, a homebuilder in Calgary, Alberta, Canada
 José Cardel, Veracruz, a city in Mexico

See also 
 Cardell, a given name